Oliver James Farr (born 25 March 1988) is a Welsh professional golfer who plays on the European Tour. He has won three times on the Challenge Tour.

Professional career
Farr played on mini-tours after turning professional. He finished first on the 2013 PGA EuroPro Tour Order of Merit to earn his Challenge Tour card for 2014. He won the Turkish Airlines Challenge in May 2014. He finished the season 10th in the Order of Merit to earn a place on the European Tour for 2015.

Farr only made 10 cuts in 30 events on the 2015 European Tour, lost his card and returned to the Challenge Tour for 2016 where he finished 36th in the Order of Merit. In 2017 he had his second Challenge Tour win, the Foshan Open, and finished the season 10th in the Order of Merit, returning to the European Tour for 2018.

Although Farr's second season on the European Tour was better than his first, he failed to regain his card and again returned to the Challenge Tour for 2019. In 2019 Farr has third win on the Challenge Tour, the Lalla Aïcha Challenge Tour, and by finishing 12th in the Order of Merit he returned to the European Tour for a third time.

Professional wins (6)

Challenge Tour wins (3)

1Co-sanctioned by the China Tour

Challenge Tour playoff record (0–1)

PGA EuroPro Tour wins (2)

Jamega Pro Golf Tour wins (1)

Results in major championships

CUT = missed the half-way cut

NT = No tournament due to the COVID-19 pandemic
Note: Farr only played in the U.S. Open and The Open Championship.

Team appearances
Amateur
European Amateur Team Championship (representing Wales): 2009, 2010, 2011
Eisenhower Trophy (representing Wales): 2010

See also
2014 Challenge Tour graduates
2017 Challenge Tour graduates
2019 Challenge Tour graduates

References

External links

Welsh male golfers
European Tour golfers
Sportspeople from Redditch
Sportspeople from Hereford
1988 births
Living people